Umachigi is a village in Dharwad district of Karnataka, India.

Demographics 
As of the 2011 Census of India there were 413 households in Umachigi and a total population of 1,980 consisting of 1,015 males and 965 females. There were 211 children ages 0-6.

References

Villages in Dharwad district